Tarigaun is a village and former Village Development Committee that is now part of Tulsipur Sub-Metropolitan City in Dang Deokhuri District in Lumbini Province of south-western Nepal. It was annexed into Tulsipur in 2014. At the time of the 1991 Nepal census it had a population of 7,685 persons living in 1087 individual households.

Transportation
Dang Airport lies in Tarigaun offering flights to Kathmandu.

References

External links
UN map of the municipalities of Dang Deokhuri District

Populated places in Dang District, Nepal